Posterholt is a village in the Dutch province of Limburg. It is located in the municipality of Roerdalen.

History 
The village was first mentioned in 1147 as Posterholt. The etymology is unclear. Posterholt is a linear forest cultivation village from the 12th century. It became an independent parish in 1793.

The Catholic St Mathias was built between 1950 and 1951 to replace the earlier church which was destroyed in 1945. The tower was added between 1961 and 1962. The Aerwinckel estate was built in 1856 and designed by Pierre Cuypers to replace the medieval castle.

Posterholt was home to 605 people in 1840. It merged with the municipalities Montfort and Sint Odiliënberg in 1991, and the new municipality changed its name to Ambt Montfort three years later. In 2007, it became part of the municipality of Roerdalen.

Together with a few other villages in the region it has also an active local history association. This association is situated in St. Odiliënberg.

Gallery

References

Populated places in Limburg (Netherlands)
Former municipalities of Limburg (Netherlands)
Municipalities of the Netherlands disestablished in 1994
Roerdalen